Martin Turk (born 21 August 2003) is a Slovenian professional footballer who plays for Italian  club Sampdoria, on loan from Parma, as a goalkeeper.

Club career 
Born in Koper, Turk played in the youth sectors of Jadran Dekani and Koper, before joining Italian side Parma in 2019, aged 15. He made his professional debut for the club on 22 February 2022, in a goalless Serie B draw against Pisa.

On 19 July 2022, Turk was loaned to Serie C side Reggiana. He made eight league appearances for Reggiana in the first half of the 2022–23 season. On 13 January 2023, Turk was re-called by Parma and subsequently loaned out to Serie A side Sampdoria for the rest of the season. He made his debut for the blucerchiati on 12 March in a 4–2 away loss against Juventus, becoming the first 2003-born goalkeeper to play in Serie A.

International career 
Turk played for various Slovenian national youth teams, such as the under-16, under-17 and under-21 teams. With the under-16 team, he was instrumental in keeping a clean sheet during a draw against Italy in 2019, saving a penalty from Sebastiano Esposito.

He was first called to the Slovenian senior team in June 2021, for a friendly game against Gibraltar, just after he played his first game with the under-21s.

During the following months, he became a regular starter with the under-21s during the Euro 2023 qualifiers, playing games such as a 2–2 draw against England and a 3–0 win against Albania.

Personal life 
During his childhood, Turk practiced dance before switching to football permanently. He is fluent in Slovene and Italian.

Both his father and his older brother played football at amateur level.

References

External links

Martin Turk at NZS 

2003 births
Living people
Sportspeople from Koper
Slovenian footballers
Slovenia youth international footballers
Slovenia under-21 international footballers
Association football goalkeepers
Parma Calcio 1913 players
A.C. Reggiana 1919 players
U.C. Sampdoria players
Serie B players
Serie C players
Serie A players
Slovenian expatriate footballers
Slovenian expatriate sportspeople in Italy
Expatriate footballers in Italy